The Nova Scotia Parliamentary Expenses Scandal is a political scandal in the province of Nova Scotia that was revealed in 2010.

Background
Part-way through the first session of the 61st General Assembly, the NDP, under Premier Darrell Dexter, announced that it would "eliminate an MLA severance payment as well as their ability to sell their office furniture and equipment." According to a report by the CBC, the severance package alone was costing the province $600,000 after the results of the last election. The province did not want MLAs who resign or are defeated to profit from selling their office furniture, and wanted the furniture to become provincial property when the MLA was done with it. The report viewed this as the first step in changing the rules regarding expenses of Nova Scotia MLAs.

The situation truly began on February 3, 2010, when Jacques Lapointe, Nova Scotia's auditor general, released a 142-page report suggesting that "several politicians had filed 'excessive and unreasonable' claims, in part because of inadequate spending controls."
According to the CBC, "MLAs in the Nova Scotia Legislature are entitled to spend $45,000/year in payments that require no receipts.
While Lapointe did not name any MLAs in his report, and said that no one had violated the law currently in place, all three parties in the Nova Scotia legislature were blamed for reckless spending, and announced his hope that more attention would be focused on repairing the expenses system rather than on demonizing legislators.

In the wake of the Auditor General's report, Speaker Charlie Parker compiled a full list of "questionable expenses", which was made public on February 8.

On February 9, 2010, the first political casualty of the scandal occurred when Richard Hurlburt, Progressive Conservative MLA for Yarmouth, resigned days after the Auditor General's report had shown he had spent about $8,000 on a generator, for his home. The Speaker's list of expenses also showed that Hurlburt had "bought a 42-inch television worth $2,499, which he paid $579 to have installed" in his constituency office in Yarmouth.

On March 12, 2010, Dave Wilson, MLA for Glace Bay, unexpectedly resigned. It was later revealed by the CBC that the Auditor General had requested a meeting on February 24, with Wilson to discuss his expenses. On February 27, Wilson hired a lawyer, and did not go to the auditor general's meeting. Wilson was originally mentioned in the Auditor general's report for spending $400 on patio furniture. When the opposition parties released figures on how much their MLAs had spent in regards to pay for  employees of their constituency office, it was shown that Wilson had spent the largest amount, paying one staffer $24,000 extra over an 18-month period, and $37,000 to others over a three-year period.

Criminal charges
On February 14, 2011, after an eight-month investigation, Hurlburt, Wilson, NDP turned Independent MLA Trevor Zinck and former Liberal cabinet minister Russell MacKinnon were all charged with fraud of over $5,000 and breach of trust by a public officer. Zinck was charged with two counts of theft of over $5,000, and Hurlburt, Wilson and MacKinnon were charged with uttering a forged document.

In September 2011, Wilson pleaded guilty to one count each of uttering forged documents, fraud and breach of trust, and was sentenced to nine months in jail and 18 months probation in April 2012. On April 12, 2012, Hurlburt pleaded guilty to fraud and breach of trust and will be sentenced on July 5. He was sentenced to a year of house arrest and a year of probation. 
MacKinnon plans to fight the charges against him in court. A preliminary hearing for Zinck had been postponed several times and a trial date has been set for June 10, 2013.

Members involved and their claims
Note:The table below counts the total amount claimed by the MLA in expenses. However, not all of these claims are for illegitimate purposes.

References

External links
The Auditor General's Report (PDF)
List of MLA's Expenses (PDF)
Hurlburt's Resignation Letter
Wilson's Resignation Letter

Corruption in Canada
Politics of Nova Scotia
2010 in Canadian politics
Parliamentary Expenses Scandal